Mermill is an unincorporated community in Wood County, in the U.S. state of Ohio.

History
A post office called Mermill was established in 1884, and remained in operation until 1954. Besides the post office, Mermill had a stave factory.

References

Unincorporated communities in Wood County, Ohio
Unincorporated communities in Ohio